Chrysanthio (before 1957: Βερσοβά - Versova) is a village in the municipal unit of Aigeira, Achaea, Greece. It is located at an altitude of 316 metres (1040 feet).

References

Populated places in Achaea